Strevens is an English surname. Notable people with the surname include:

 Ben Strevens (born 1980), English footballer and manager
 John Strevens (1902–1990), English artist 
 Leofranc Holford-Strevens (born 1946), English scholar

See also
Stevens (surname)

English-language surnames